Theocolax elegans is a parasitic wasp species in the genus Theocolax. It is a parasite of immature stages of stored grain pest insects such as Sitophilus granarius or Rhyzopertha dominica.

References

External links 

 Choetospila elegans Westwood, 1874 at gbif.org
 Theocolax elegans (Westwood) at nbaii.res.in

Pteromalidae
Insects used as insect pest control agents
Biological pest control wasps
Insects described in 1874